Pershing County is a county in the U.S. state of Nevada. As of the 2020 census, the population was 6,650. Its county seat is Lovelock. The county was named after army general John J. Pershing (1860–1948). It was formed from Humboldt County in 1919, and the last county to be established in Nevada. The Black Rock Desert, location for the annual Burning Man event, is partially in the county. The county is listed as Nevada Historical Marker 17. The marker is at the courthouse in Lovelock.

Geography
The tallest and most topographically prominent mountain in Pershing County is Star Peak at 9,840 ft (3,000 m).

Major highways

  Interstate 80
  Interstate 80 Business (Lovelock)
  U.S. Route 95
  U.S. Route 95 Business (Lovelock)
  State Route 396
  State Route 397
  State Route 398
  State Route 399
  State Route 400
  State Route 401
  State Route 854
  State Route 856
  State Route 860

Adjacent counties
 Washoe County - west
 Humboldt County - north
 Lander County - east
 Churchill County - south

National protected area
 Black Rock Desert-High Rock Canyon Emigrant Trails National Conservation Area (part)

Demographics

2000 census
At the 2000 census there were 6,693 people, 1,962 households, and 1,383 families living in the county.  The population density was 1 person per square mile (0.4/km2).  There were 2,389 housing units at an average density of 0.39 per square mile (0.15/km2).  The racial makeup of the county was 77.69% White, 5.35% Black or African American, 3.42% Native American, 0.63% Asian, 0.22% Pacific Islander, 9.38% from other races, and 3.30% from two or more races.  19.33% of the population were Hispanic or Latino of any race.
Of the 1,962 households 38.40% had children under the age of 18 living with them, 57.20% were married couples living together, 7.30% had a female householder with no husband present, and 29.50% were non-families. 24.30% of households were one person and 8.60% were one person aged 65 or older.  The average household size was 2.69 and the average family size was 3.22.

The age distribution was 25.70% under the age of 18, 8.50% from 18 to 24, 36.00% from 25 to 44, 22.10% from 45 to 64, and 7.80% 65 or older.  The median age was 34 years. For every 100 females there were 158.80 males.  For every 100 females age 18 and over, there were 182.10 males.

The median household income was $40,670 and the median family income  was $46,268. Males had a median income of $34,417 versus $24,301 for females. The per capita income for the county was $16,589.  About 10.20% of families and 11.40% of the population were below the poverty line, including 14.20% of those under age 18 and 5.60% of those age 65 or over.

2010 census
At the 2010 census, there were 6,753 people, 2,018 households, and 1,375 families living in the county. The racial makeup of the county was 81.9% white, 3.7% black or African American, 3.2% American Indian, 1.3% Asian, 0.1% Pacific islander, 6.7% from other races, and 3.1% from two or more races. Those of Hispanic or Latino origin made up 22.3% of the population. In terms of ancestry, 19.5% were German, 16.8% were Irish, 13.8% were English, 5.1% were Italian, and 4.4% were American.

Of the 2,018 households, 31.6% had children under the age of 18 living with them, 51.9% were married couples living together, 9.1% had a female householder with no husband present, 31.9% were non-families, and 26.6% of households were made up of individuals. The average household size was 2.51 and the average family size was 3.02. The median age was 41.0 years.

The median household income was $56,491 and the median family income  was $61,410. Males had a median income of $51,333 versus $28,871 for females. The per capita income for the county was $17,519. About 10.2% of families and 13.7% of the population were below the poverty line, including 23.0% of those under age 18 and 2.7% of those age 65 or over.

Communities

City
 Lovelock (county seat)
Black Rock City (temporary)

Census-designated places
 Grass Valley
 Humboldt River Ranch
 Imlay
 Unionville

Unincorporated communities
Many of the following places are considered ghost towns.

 Dun Glen/Chafey 
 Etna
 Humboldt City
 Mazuma
 Mill City
 Rochester 
 Scossa 
 Seven Troughs 
 Star City 
 Vernon

Politics

See also

 National Register of Historic Places listings in Pershing County, Nevada

References

External links
 

 
1919 establishments in Nevada
Populated places established in 1919